The Nutrition Society is a main scientific learned society in the field of nutritional science, headquartered in London.

History
It was founded in 1941. On Tuesday 14 October 1941, a founding meeting was held at the Royal Institution. 

In April 1943, an oversight Advisory Committee on Nutrition Surveys was set up, overseen by Sir Joseph Barcroft, and supported by the Ministry of Health and Ministry of Food. A
In 1993, a database was set up, with the Institute of Biology, of registered nutritionists. The register for nutritionists was divested as the Association for Nutrition.

Structure
It was incorporated as a company in August 1976.

See also
 American Society for Nutrition
 Association for Nutrition, regulates the profession in the UK
 British Nutrition Foundation, provides health education on diet in the UK
 Federation of European Nutrition Societies
 Catherine Geissler, former president of the Nutrition Society

References

External links
 The Nutrition Society

1941 establishments in the United Kingdom
Association for Nutrition
Nutrition
Medical and health organisations based in London
Nutritional science organizations
Scientific organizations established in 1941
Scientific societies based in the United Kingdom